Gibbula candei is a species of sea snail, a marine gastropod mollusk in the family Trochidae, the top snails.

Description
The naturalist Alcide d'Orbigny named the gastropod after Ferdinand de Candé.

The size of an adult shell varies between 10 mm and 20 mm. The conoidal shell is olive-yellowish with purplish spots on the top. The shell is elevated and longitudinally unequally striate. The spire is gradate. The whorls are subbicarinate, smooth and flat.  The aperture is subquadrangular. The open umbilicus has a smooth texture.

Distribution
This species occurs in the Atlantic Ocean off Madeira and the Canary Islands.

References

 Gofas, S.; Le Renard, J.; Bouchet, P. (2001). Mollusca, in: Costello, M.J. et al. (Ed.) (2001). European register of marine species: a check-list of the marine species in Europe and a bibliography of guides to their identification. Collection Patrimoines Naturels, 50: pp. 180–213

External links
 

candei
Gastropods described in 1844
Molluscs of Madeira
Molluscs of the Canary Islands